The 1996 European Parliament election in Austria was the election of the delegation from Austria to the European Parliament in 1996.

Background
Source:

In 1996, Austria was a country with a population of 7.9 million (5.8 million voters). The federal government was a "grand coalition" of the Social Democratic Party (SPÖ) and the Christian Democratic Party (ÖVP) and was led by Chancellor Franz Vranitzky.

Source:

At the last national election in 1995, the parties obtained the following results: SPÖ: 38.1%, ÖVP: 28.3%, FPÖ: 21.9%, Liberals: 5.5% and Greens: 4.8%.

Composition before election
Source:

 PES Group (8): Albrecht Karl KONECNY, Elisabeth HLAVAC, Erhard MEIER, Erich FARTHOFER, Herbert BÖSCH, Hilde HAWLICEK*, Ilona GRAENITZ, Irene CREPAZ.
 EPP Group (6): Agnes SCHIERHUBER, Friedrich KÖNIG, Michael SPINDELEGGER, Milan LINZER, Paul RÜBIG, Reinhard RACK*.
 NI (FPÖ) (5): Erich SCHREINER, Franz LINSER*, Klaus LUKAS, Wolfgang JUNG, Wolfgang NUßBAUMER.
 ELDR Group (1): Martina GREDLER*
 Green Group (1): Johannes VOGGENHUBER*.

An asterisk (*) indicates Members standing for re-election.

Electoral system
Source:

The electoral system used for the European elections was based on proportional representation, comparable to the system traditionally used in Austria for legislative elections.

The parties put forward lists of candidates. The seats are shared out on the basis of the percentage of the votes obtained by each list. Because of the limited number of seats, the lists were identical for the whole of Austria; there were no regional lists. The threshold required to win a seat was 4%. Candidates who win 7% of the total 'preference votes' obtained by their party would win one of the seats accorded to the party, irrespective of their position on the list. The lists of candidates had to be signed by three members of the national parliament, or by one Member of the European Parliament, or by 2600 voters. The minimum voting age was 18. European citizens residing in Austria were entitled to vote provided that they did not vote in their country of origin in the June 1994 European elections. 7205 European citizens registered and fulfilled that condition.

Parties running for election
Source:

The following political parties entered lists for the European elections on 13 October 1996:

Parties represented in the EP
 SPÖ (social democrats): chief candidate Mr Hannes SWOBODA.
 ÖVP (Christian democrats): chief candidate Mrs Ursula STENZEL.
 FPÖ (non-attached): chief candidate Mr Franz LINSER*.
 Liberales Forum (liberals): chief candidate Mr Friedhelm FRISCHENSCHLAGER.
 Die Grünen (greens): chief candidate Mr Johannes VOGGENHUBER*.

Parties not represented in the EP
 Forum Handicap (group defending the interests of the handicapped): Mr Klaus VOGET.
 KPÖ (communists): Mr Walter BAIER.
 N-Die Neutralen (group campaigning for the retention of neutrality)

Results

References

Austria
European Parliament elections in Austria
1996 elections in Austria
October 1996 events in Europe